Darryl or Darrell Morris may refer to:
 Darryl Morris (American football) (born 1990), American football cornerback
 Darryl Morris (presenter) (born 1990), radio presenter
 Darryl Morris (Charmed), a character in the TV series